Bakiabad is a census town in Mirzapur district  in the state of Uttar Pradesh, India.

Demographics
 India census, Bakiabad had a population of 3979. Males constitute 53% of the population and females 47%. Bakiabad has an average literacy rate of 71%, higher than the national average of 59.5%; with 60% of the males and 40% of females literate. 11% of the population is under 6 years of age.

References

Cities and towns in Mirzapur district